Leo Clyde Wardrup, Jr. (September 5, 1936 – July 2, 2014) was an American naval officer and politician.

Born in Middlesboro, Kentucky, Wardrup received his bachelor's degree from University of North Carolina at Chapel Hill and his master's degrees from George Washington University and Naval War College. Wardrup was a captain in the United States Navy from 1958 to 1986. He lived in Virginia Beach, Virginia. He served in the Virginia House of Delegates, as a Republican from 1992 until 2007.

Notes

External links
 
 

1936 births
2014 deaths
People from Middlesboro, Kentucky
Politicians from Virginia Beach, Virginia
University of North Carolina at Chapel Hill alumni
George Washington University alumni
Naval War College alumni
United States Navy officers
Republican Party members of the Virginia House of Delegates